St. Vincent de Paul School is a Catholic elementary and junior high school in Calgary, Canada.

Options
There are many options in the school for junior high such as Sports Performance, Drama, Art, French (Grade 8 and 9 only.  It is mandatory for grade 7), and Band. Up until the 2012-2013 school year, information processing (referred to as "info pro") was also available. Junior high students choose two options prior to the new school year.

Drama

The St. Vincent de Paul drama option is available throughout junior high. Productions have included Romeo And Winifred, The Case Of The Missing Ring, and Charlie And The Chocolate Factory. More recent productions include "Greece the Musical", "Peggy the Pint-Sized Pirate", "Snow White", and "The Superhero Support Group".

Sports
The sports teams include volleyball, cross country (which won 13 years in a row), wrestling, basketball, badminton, and flag football. There is also the annual Viking Cup floor hockey tournament. Pep rallies are held regularly, the most notable being a volleyball game with teachers playing against students

Computer lab
The school does not have computer labs anymore but now have chromebooks.

Modernization
On January 21, 2014, the Alberta government announced that St. Vincent De Paul would be one of the nine schools in Calgary to be renovated. Many repairs, including an approx. 2 million dollar roof repair, will be performed over the next two years. Most repairs will take place on the elementary segment of the school, sending elementary students to Monsignor E.L Doyle School. Junior high students, although being moved mostly to portable classrooms, will have access to the gymnasium, Career Technology Studies (CTS) labs, band room and washrooms. A Lifelong learning program is being proposed, substituting a second option, where students choose a program for three forty-five-minute periods, one day out of the six-day-cycle.

References

Elementary schools in Calgary
Middle schools in Calgary
Catholic elementary schools in Canada
Educational institutions in Canada with year of establishment missing